Acronicta tristis is a moth of the family Noctuidae. It is found from Ontario, Quebec and New Brunswick, south to Maryland, Pennsylvania and Ohio.

The wingspan is about 34 mm. Adults are on wing from June to July.

External links
Species info
Image
Moths of Maryland

tristis
Moths of North America
Moths described in 1911